Out is a 2020 American computer-animated short film directed and written by Steven Hunter, produced by Max Sachar, and distributed by Pixar Animation Studios and Walt Disney Studios Motion Pictures. The plot features a young gay man who has not yet come out to his parents, who unexpectedly has his mind magically swapped with his dog's. The seventh short film in the SparkShorts series, it is both Disney's and Pixar's first short to feature a gay main character and storyline, including an on-screen same-sex kiss. The short was released on Disney+ on May 22, 2020. The short was shortlisted for the Academy Award for Best Animated Short Film at the 93rd Academy Awards.

Plot 
A magical cat and dog appear outside Greg's townhouse, as he and his boyfriend Manuel are packing his belongings to move. The cat imbues the collar of Greg's dog Jim with magic. Inside, reminiscing about a photo of them together, Manuel encourages Greg to come out to his parents, who unexpectedly show up to help. Greg hastily hides the photo and Manuel quietly exits by the back door. Holding Jim's collar, Greg casually wishes aloud that he would became
a dog, and the minds of Greg and Jim magically switch bodies. "Greg" runs outside to play in the yard, where his stoic father is lighting the grill. "Jim" tries to get to him, while also frantically trying to prevent his eagerly helpful mother from finding the photo.

Frustrated by the dog's misbehavior, she sits and talks aloud of her sadness about her son moving away, as "Jim" listens. Imagining a conversation with Greg, she hopes that he finds someone who loves him, and "that he makes you happy". "Jim" suddenly realizes that she not only already knows that he is gay, but she also accepts it. He briefly comforts her, then chases down "Greg", and successfully switches their minds back. That evening, Greg introduces Manuel to his parents; Greg's father spontaneously hugs Manuel. The magical cat and dog see their mission accomplished, and leap away on a rainbow.

Cast 
 Caleb Cabrera as Manuel
 Matthew Martin as Gigi the Cat
 Kyle McDaniel as Greg
 Bernadette Sullivan as Mom

Production 
Out is the seventh film in Pixar's "SparkShorts" program. It was directed and written by Steven Clay Hunter, known for animation work on Finding Nemo and WALL-E, and produced by Max Sachar, known for his work on Coco and Toy Story 3.

Music 
Jake Monaco composed the music for Out. The score was released on July 3, 2020.

Track listing

Release 
Out was released on Disney+ on May 22, 2020, and on YouTube in June 2021 as part of the year's Pride Month celebrations.

Reception

Critical response 
Kshitij Rawat of The Indian Express stated Out explores the apprehensions felt by members of the LGBTQ community during the coming out, found the story emotional across its running time, and called the animation unique and fresh through its style. Jennifer Green of Common Sense Media rated the short film 5 out of 5 stars, praised the educational value, stating the short film promotes acceptance, and applauded the depiction of positive messages and role models, citing familial and romantic love.

Accolades

References

External links 
 
 
 Out on YouTube

2020s animated short films
2020s Disney animated short films
2020 computer-animated films
2020s English-language films
2020 LGBT-related films
2020 short films
American animated short films
American LGBT-related short films
American teen comedy films
Body swapping in films
Films scored by Jake Monaco
Gay-related films
LGBT-related animated films
SparkShorts